Darren Rizzi (born July 21, 1970) is an American football coach who is the assistant head coach and special teams coordinator for the New Orleans Saints of the National Football League (NFL). Prior to this, he was the Miami Dolphins special teams coordinator. He was one of few Miami coaches to see multiple regimes. He even interviewed for the head coach position for the Dolphins after the 2018 season. After Miami hired head coach Brian Flores, they decided to move on from Rizzi. Before the NFL, he was the head coach of the University of New Haven Chargers football team from 1999 to 2001 and the Rhode Island Rams football team in 2008. He compiled an overall record of 18–23.

Early life 
Rizzi grew up in Hillsdale, New Jersey, and graduated from Bergen Catholic High School in nearby Oradell. He was later a resident of Oradell.
Family life CAMERON RIZZI

Coaching career

Miami Dolphins
Rizzi coordinated the Miami Dolphins special teams efforts from 2011 to 2018, additionally serving as assistant head coach/special teams coordinator from 2015 to 2016 and associate head coach/special teams coordinator from 2017 to 2018. Rizzi was not retained under incoming head coach Brian Flores.

New Orleans Saints
On February 1, 2019, the New Orleans Saints hired Rizzi as the special teams coordinator. Rizzi would be reunited with Saints assistant head coach and tight ends coach Dan Campbell, whom coached alongside Rizzi with the Miami Dolphins from 2010 to 2015, under head coaches Tony Sparano and Joe Philbin. On February 23, 2022, it was announced that Rizzi would be assuming the title of assistant head coach alongside his special teams responsibilities.

Head coaching record

References

1970 births
Living people
Bergen Catholic High School alumni
Colgate Raiders football coaches
Miami Dolphins coaches
New Haven Chargers football coaches
Northeastern Huskies football coaches
People from Hillsdale, New Jersey
People from Oradell, New Jersey
Philadelphia Eagles players
Rhode Island Rams football coaches
Rhode Island Rams football players
Rutgers Scarlet Knights football coaches
New Orleans Saints coaches